Events from the year 1800 in Russia

Incumbents
 Monarch – Paul I

Events

 
  Chevalier Guard Regiment
 Second League of Armed Neutrality

Births

Deaths

 Alexander Suvorov (born 1730)

References

1800 in Russia
Years of the 18th century in the Russian Empire